KOLT (1320 AM) was a radio station, which last broadcast a News Talk Information format. Licensed to Scottsbluff, Nebraska, United States, the station was last owned by Nebraska Rural Radio Association and carried talk programs, with hosts such as Glenn Beck, Rush Limbaugh, Sean Hannity & Dave Ramsey. It was taken silent November 1, 2019, and its call sign was changed from KOLT to KOAQ on November 11, 2019, while it was silent. Its license was surrendered January 17, 2020.

Ownership
In May 2013, Armada Media and Legacy Broadcasting traded some stations in Nebraska, with two stations in Holdrege (KUVR/1380 and KMTY/97.7) going to Legacy and eight others in the Scottsbluff and North Platte markets (KZTL/93.5 (Paxton-North Platte) and KRNP/100.7 (Sutherland-North Platte)  KOAQ/690 (Terrytown), KOLT/1320 (Scottsbluff), KMOR/93.3 (Gering), KETT/99.3 (Mitchell), KOZY-FM/101.3 (Bridgeport), KHYY/106.9 (Minatare)) going to Armada Media. A purchase price was not announced.

Effective January 17, 2020, Armada Media sold KOAQ, six sister stations, and a translator to Nebraska Rural Radio Association for $1.75 million.

References

External links
FCC Station Search Details: DKOAQ  (Facility ID: 67471)
FCC History Cards for KOAQ (covering 1929-1980 as KGKY / KOLT)

OAQ (AM)
Radio stations established in 1930
Radio stations disestablished in 2020
1930 establishments in Nebraska
2020 disestablishments in Nebraska
Defunct radio stations in the United States
Defunct mass media in Nebraska